Damon Joseph Kelly (born 1 December 1983 in Atherton, Queensland) is an Australian weightlifter who competed at the 2008 Olympic Games finishing ninth. Damon recorded lifts of 165 kg in the Snatch and 221 kg in the Clean and Jerk with a total of 386 kg.  He was the biggest member of the Australian Olympic Team and was Australia's only male weightlifter at the Games, having secured the sole position with a personal best lift on his final attempt at the Olympic Nomination Trials.

He competed for Australia again at the 2012 Summer Olympics, finishing 16th with a total of 381 kg (216 in the clean and jerk, and 165 in the snatch).

Kelly won a Silver Medal at the 2006 Commonwealth Games in the 105 kg+ division and Gold at the 2010 Commonwealth Games in Delhi and holds the Commonwealth Games record for the Clean and Jerk.  He has been undefeated at the Australian Championships since 2006 and is also the reigning Oceania champion.  At the 2014 Commonwealth Games, he finished third, 12 kg behind the winner.

He started weightlifting as a 14-year-old at St Laurence's College in Brisbane where he also excelled at Rugby Union, playing in the First XV alongside Australian national rugby league team halfback Cooper Cronk, and Shot Put, setting the college record. He trains at Cougars Weightlifting Club in Brisbane under coach Miles Wydall.

Personal bests

References

Records

External links

Athlete Biography at Beijing 2008

1983 births
Australian male weightlifters
Commonwealth Games bronze medallists for Australia
Commonwealth Games gold medallists for Australia
Commonwealth Games silver medallists for Australia
Living people
Olympic weightlifters of Australia
Weightlifters at the 2006 Commonwealth Games
Weightlifters at the 2008 Summer Olympics
Weightlifters at the 2010 Commonwealth Games
Weightlifters at the 2012 Summer Olympics
Weightlifters at the 2014 Commonwealth Games
Commonwealth Games medallists in weightlifting
People from Atherton, Queensland
20th-century Australian people
21st-century Australian people
Medallists at the 2006 Commonwealth Games
Medallists at the 2010 Commonwealth Games
Medallists at the 2014 Commonwealth Games